Kafr Manda or Kfar Menda is an Arab town in the Lower Galilee, on the slopes of Mount Atzmon in Israel's Northern District. The inhabitants are predominantly Arab Muslims.

History

Classical antiquity 
Kafr Manda is located on an ancient site on a low hill. Ancient relics have been found, including architectural fragments, two fragmentary columns and capitals. Some remains from the Roman and  Byzantine era have been found.

Kafr Manda is identified with Kfar Mandi, a Jewish village mentioned in the Talmudic and the Midrash literature. The Talmud mentions an amora under the name of Issachar of Kfar Mandi who studied Torah in Sepphoris.

Middle Ages 

According to the 13th century Muslim scholar Yaqut al-Hamawi, Kafr Manda was: "A village lying between Tabariyyah  and 'Akkah. It is said to be called by the name Madyan (Midian). The tomb of the wife of Moses is seen here. Also, the pit covered by the rock which Moses raised up in order give himself and his wife water to drink. The rock is still shown.  At Kafar Mandah may also be seen the tombs of two of Jacob's sons Ashir (Asher) and Nafshali (Naphthali), as is reported." 

In 1962, “hundreds of clay jars, some of which were intact” dating to the 14th–15th centuries were found. Other remains from the Mamluk era have also been excavated.

Medieval rabbinic traditions identified Kfar Mandi as the burial site of three Jewish Mishnaic sages: Gamliel II, Issachar of Kfar Mandi and Rabbi Akiba ben Mahalalel.

Ottoman Empire 
Incorporated into the Ottoman Empire in 1517 with all of Palestine,  Kafr Manda  appeared   in the  1596 tax registers  as being in the  nahiya (subdistrict) of  Tabariyya under the Liwa of Safad. It had an entirely Muslim population consisting of 93 households and 11 bachelors. Taxes were paid on wheat, barley, olive trees,  cotton, soghum, goats and/or beehives, and a press for olives or grapes, a total of 13,028 akçe.

In the early 18th century, the village was walled, and defended by several small forts. A map from Napoleon's invasion of 1799 by Pierre Jacotin  showed the place, named as K. Mendah.

In 1838, Edward Robinson noted  Kefr Menda as a Muslim village in the Nazareth district, while in 1852, he noted: "Kefr Menda is a considerable village at the foot of the northern hills [...] Among the people of the village are some of the descendants of Dhaher el-'Omar. The great well of the village was said to be fourteen fathoms in depth, besides seven fathoms of water. Around it lay three ancient sarcophagi [used] as drinking-troughs; one of them sculptured on the side with rather elegant festoons. Two lids of sarcophagi were also built into or upon the wall of the reservoir above; and near by was a small ancient basin of variegated limestone." The same year, (1852), the population was given as 200 souls, and the tillage twenty feddans.

In 1875, Victor Guérin found the village to have about 400 inhabitants, all Muslim.

In 1881,  the Palestine Exploration Fund's Survey of Western Palestine described Kefr Menda as an "adobe village at the foot of Jebel ed Deibebeh, having a white muqam in it," while a population list from about 1887 showed that  Kefr Menda had about  250 Muslim inhabitants.

British Mandate 
In the 1922 census of Palestine, conducted  by the British Mandate authorities, Kufr Manda had a total population of 428, all Muslim.  In  the 1931 census the population of Kafr Manda, together with Arab el Hujeirat, was a total of  975, all Muslim, in 187 inhabited houses.

In the 1945 statistics the population of Kafr Manda was 1,260 Muslims, who owned 14,935 dunams of land  according to an official land and population survey. 795 dunams were plantations and irrigable land, 7,960  for cereals, while 47 dunams were built-up (urban) land.

Israel 
On the crossroads between Acre and Nazareth, Kafr Manda surrendered to the advancing Israeli army during Operation Hiram, 29–31 October 1948. Many of the villagers fled north but some stayed and were not expelled by the Israeli soldiers. The town remained under Martial Law until 1966. It achieved local council status in 1973. Since then, roads have been paved, schools have been built and infrastructures such as sewage, electricity and irrigation systems have been introduced.  In 1979, a bomb attack killed four people and injured eleven.

See also
 Arab localities in Israel
 Sinai bus crash

References

Bibliography

External links
Welcome To Kafr Manda
Survey of Western Palestine, Map 5:  IAA, Wikimedia commons 
Yigal Alon Museum 
Israeli Arab Hamas recruits indicted The Jerusalem Post
Manda information

Arab localities in Israel
Local councils in Northern District (Israel)